Thésée is a tragédie en musique, an early type of French opera, in a prologue and five acts with music by Jean-Baptiste Lully and a libretto by Philippe Quinault based on Ovid's Metamorphoses. It was first performed on 11 January 1675 by the Paris Opera for the royal court at the Château de Saint-Germain-en-Laye and was first performed in public in April at the Théâtre du Palais-Royal in Paris.

The plot centres around a love triangle: Aegeus wants to marry his ward, princess Aegle, while the sorceress Medea wishes to marry the young warrior Theseus, but Theseus and Aegle love each other. Medea attempts to force the lovers to renounce each other: first by using her magic to bring Aegle to a place of torment, then by convincing Aegeus to have Theseus killed as a potential threat to his reign. But before Theseus can drink the poison he has been given, Aegeus realises that Theseus is his lost son. He then gives Aegle to Theseus. Medea takes vengeance by destroying the festive setting, but the goddess Minerva undoes this.

Roles

Synopsis

Prologue
Mars and Venus and their followers sing the praises of Louis XIV.

Act 1
Princess Aegle is in love with Theseus and prays for his safe return from battle against rebels who are threatening King Aegeus of Athens. Aegeus enters victorious. He tells Aegle he is in love with her, despite being betrothed to the sorceress Medea. Égée says he now intends to marry Medea to his son, whom he has hidden away at Troezen and has not seen for years. The Athenians celebrate their victory with a sacrifice to the goddess Minerva.

Act 2
Medea is in love with Theseus. She agrees to let Aegeus break off their engagement, so he can pursue Aegle. Aegeus is jealous of Theseus's popularity with the people of Athens, who want to make him the king's heir because of his bravery in battle. Medea offers to help Theseus, who reveals to her that he is in love with Aegle, provoking the sorceress to jealousy.

Act 3
Medea threatens Aegle that she will use her magic against her if the princess does not renounce her love for Theseus and marry the king instead. She conjures up a vision of a terrifying desert full of monsters, and also menaces Aegle with demons from hell.

Act 4
Medea orders Aegle to marry Aegeus, otherwise she will put Theseus's life in danger. She conjures a vision of the sleeping Theseus in which she threatens to sacrifice him with a knife. Theseus wakes and is perplexed by Églé's sudden coldness towards him. She explains she is trying to save his life. Theseus reveals that he is Égée's son from Troezen. Medea appears to relent and bless the betrothal of Theseus and Aegle.

Act 5
In reality, Medea is still tortured by jealousy. She persuades Aegeus to kill Theseus, warning him that if he makes Theseus his heir, the king will wrong his missing son. Aegeus hands Theseus a poisoned chalice, but he recognises Theseus's sword and realises the young man must be his son. Just in time, he prevents Theseus from drinking the poison. He agrees to let Theseus marry Aegle. Thwarted, Medea escapes on a flying chariot pulled by dragons, burning down the palace. The Athenians pray to Minerva who raises a magnificent new palace and the opera ends with rejoicing.

Recording
Thésée, Howard Crook (Theseus), Laura Pudwell (Medea), Ellen Hargis (Aegle), Harry van der Kamp (Aegeus), Boston Early Music Festival Chorus and Orchestra, conducted by Paul O'Dette and Stephen Stubbs (CPO, 3 CDs, 2007)

References
Notes

Sources
Original libretto: Thésée. Tragédie en Musique Ornée d'Entrées de Ballet, De Machines & de Changements de Theatre. Representée devant Sa Majesté à Saint Germain en Laye, le dixième jour de Ianvier 1675, Paris, Ballard, 1675 (accessible for free online at Gallica - B.N.F.)
Period printed score: Thésée. Tragédie mise en musique par Monsiuer De Lully, Sur-Intendant de la Musique du Roy, Paris, Ballard, 1688 (accessible online at Gallica - B.N.F.)
 Parvopassu, Clelia, Thésée, in Gelli, Piero & Poletti, Filippo (ed), Dizionario dell'opera 2008, Milan, Baldini Castoldi Dalai, 2007, pp. 1280–1281,  (reproduced online at Opera Manager).
The New Grove French Baroque Masters, ed. Graham Sadler (Macmillan, 1986)
The Viking Opera Guide ed. Holden (Viking, 1993)
 Le magazine de l'opéra baroque by Jean-Claude Brenac

External links 
 

Operas by Jean-Baptiste Lully
French-language operas
Operas
1675 operas
Operas based on classical mythology
Operas based on Metamorphoses